is a JR West Kabe Line station located in Furuichi, Asaminami-ku, Hiroshima, Hiroshima Prefecture, Japan.

Station layout
Furuichibashi Station features two side platforms serving two tracks. The station building is next to the Hiroshima bound platform. There is no overpass; passengers must use a railway crossing to reach the other platform. A ticket office is available at this station during the daytime.

Platforms

History
November 19, 1909: Furuichibashi Station opens
April 1, 1987: Japanese National Railways is privatized, and Furuichibashi Station becomes a JR West station

Surrounding Area
 Japan National Route 54
Asaminami Ward Office
Hiroshima Furuichi Post Office
Hiroshima Municipal Furuichi Elementary School
Hiroshima Municipal Ōmachi Elementary School
Hiroshima Municipal Gion Kita High School
Hiroshima Bank
Iyo Bank
Momiji Bank
Hesaka Station, on the JR West Geibi Line

External links

 JR West

Kabe Line
Hiroshima City Network
Stations of West Japan Railway Company in Hiroshima city
Railway stations in Japan opened in 1909